Heinrich Altvater (27 August 1902 – 25 February 1994) was a German international footballer.

References

1902 births
1994 deaths
German footballers
Association football wingers
Germany international footballers